Potter's Field is the second studio album by the American rock band 12 Stones. It was released on August 24, 2004. The album debuted on the Billboard 200 at No. 29, making it the band's highest charting album.

Track listing

Personnel 

12 Stones
 Paul McCoy – lead and backing vocals 
 Eric Weaver – lead guitar 
 Kevin Dorr – bass guitar
 Aaron Gainer – drums, percussion
 Greg Trammell – rhythm guitar 

Production
 Dave Fortman – producer, mixing
 Jeremy Parker  – audio engineering
 Ovis – additional digital editing
 Ted Jensen – audio mastering at Sterling Sound, NYC, NY 
 Wes Fontenot – assistant engineer
 Kelly "Dred" Liebelt – assistant engineer
 Wilton Wall – assistant engineer
 Rory Faciane – drum technician

Artwork
 Ed Sherman – Art direction and design
 Chapman Baehler – band photography
 Create Dynamic Graphics – additional photography

Management
 Kenny Vest – management for K-Vest
 Gregg Wattenberg – Wind-Up production supervisor 
 Diana Mettzer – A&R
 Chipper – A&R administration

Charts

References

12 Stones albums
2004 albums
Albums produced by Dave Fortman